The Ambarawa Railway Museum, (officially named Indonesian Railway Museum by the Indonesian Railway Company) is a museum located in Ambarawa in Central Java, Indonesia. The museum focuses on the collection of steam locomotives, the remains of the closing of the  railway line.

Museum building and location
Ambarawa was a military city during the Dutch Colonial Government. King Willem I ordered the construction of a new railway station to enable the government to transport its troops to Semarang. On 21 May 1873, the Ambarawa railway station was built on a 127,500 m² land. This was known back then as Willem I Station. It was finished at the same time as the Kedungjati-Bringin-Tuntang-Ambarawa line.

The station building consists of two main building for waiting room and station master room.

The Willem I railway station was originally a transhipment point between the  gauge branch from Kedungjati to the northeast and the  gauge line onward towards Yogyakarta via Magelang to the south. It is still possible to see that the two sides of the station were built to accommodate different size trains.

On 8 April 1976, the Ambarawa railway station was officially converted into the Ambarawa Railway Museum by the governor of Central Java Province at that time Supardjo Rustam. The museum preserves the steam locomotives, which were then coming to the end of their useful lives when the  gauge railways of the Indonesian State Railway (the Perusahaan Negara Kereta Api, PNKA) was closed. These are parked in the open air next to the original station.

In 2010, the building of Ambarawa Railway Museum was made heritage building.

Railway line

The  gauge line towards Yogyakarta (runs roughly south-west from Ambarawa) was of particular interest because it contained sections of rack railway between Jambu and Secang, the only such operation in Java. This line beyond Bedono closed in the early 1970s after it was damaged in an earthquake, but had already lost most of its passenger traffic to buses on the parallel road. The line from Kedungjati (runs east initially from Ambarawa) survived into the middle 1970s but saw very little traffic near the end, not least because it was far quicker to travel more directly by road to Semarang. The presence of the rack line meant that there was probably never much through traffic from Semarang to Yogyakarta.

Services
Currently, there is operating heritage railway between Ambarawa–Bedono, operated by steam locomotive. In addition, there is also tourist railway between Ambarawa–Tuntang.

Collection

The museum collected 21 steam locomotives. Currently four locomotives are operational. Other collections of the museum include old telephones, Morse telegraph equipment, old bells and signals equipment, and some antique furniture.

Some of the steam locomotives are the 2 B25 class 0-4-2RT B2502 and B2503 which is from the original fleet of 5 supplied to the line about 100 years ago (a third locomotive, B 2501, is preserved in a park in the town nearby). The E10 class 0-10-0RT E1060 which was originally delivered to West Sumatra in the 1960s for working the coal railway, but was brought to Java, later returned again to Sawahlunto, and a conventional locomotive 2-6-0T C1218 which was restored to working order in 2006, but transferred to Solo to working as tourist train, named Sepur Kluthuk Jaladara. The museum also have a small diesel shunter D300 class 0-8-0D D300 23, previously based at Cepu, an old UH-295 crane from Semarang, and the newly restored B51 class 4-4-0 B5112 specially for Ambarawa-Tuntang line. Other locomotive collections are type C1240, C1603, C2821, and CC5029.

See also
 List of museums and cultural institutions in Indonesia

References

Literature

External links 

 Travel in Indonesia
 International Steam | Ambarawa Railway Museum
 YouTube| Ambarawa Railway Museum

Semarang Regency
Museums in Central Java
Railway museums in Indonesia
Heritage railways
Museums established in 1976
Railway stations in Central Java
Railway stations opened in 1873
1976 establishments in Indonesia